Normand Rochefort (born January 28, 1961) is a Canadian former professional ice hockey defenceman.

Biography
Rochefort was born in Trois-Rivières, Quebec. As a youth, he played in the 1974 Quebec International Pee-Wee Hockey Tournament with a minor ice hockey team from Trois-Rivières. Drafted in 1980 by the Quebec Nordiques, he played eight seasons for the Nordiques before being traded to the New York Rangers. He was a member of Team Canada in the 1987 Canada Cup.  He finished out his NHL career with a short stint with the Tampa Bay Lightning in 1993. He then agreed to assist coaching the Acadie-Bathurst Titans.  In 2002, he came out of retirement to play minor league hockey with his son Billy Rochefort.

Awards and achievements
QMJHL Rookie of the Year (Shared award with Denis Savard) (1978)
Memorial Cup Tournament All-Star Team (1979)
QMJHL Second All-Star Team (1980)

Career statistics

Regular season and playoffs

International

References

External links
Profile at legends of hockey.net

1961 births
Atlanta Knights players
Canadian ice hockey defencemen
Denver Grizzlies players
Eisbären Berlin players
French Quebecers
Sportspeople from Trois-Rivières
Jacksonville Barracudas (SPHL) players
Kansas City Blades players
Living people
New York Rangers players
Quebec Nordiques draft picks
Quebec Nordiques players
Quebec Remparts players
San Francisco Spiders players
Tampa Bay Lightning players
Trois-Rivières Draveurs players
Ice hockey people from Quebec
Muskegon Fury players
Canadian expatriate ice hockey players in Germany